Michael Noon (16 August 1875–1939) was an English footballer who played in the Football League for Aston Villa and Burton Swifts.

References

1875 births
1939 deaths
English footballers
Association football defenders
English Football League players
Burton Swifts F.C. players
Aston Villa F.C. players
Plymouth Argyle F.C. players
Burton United F.C. players
Coalville Town F.C. players